Prashanth R Vihari is an Indian music composer who works in Telugu-language films. He is known for his work in Chi La Sow (2018) and Dorasaani (2019).

Career 
Vihari began his music career at A. R. Rahman’s KM Music Conservatory and LV Prasad Film Academy. Yakub Ali signed Vihari to make his debut with Vellipomakey after Ali saw Vihari's "Suttum Vizhi Chudar Thaan Kannamma", a rendition of Bharatiyar's poem. The soundtrack of Vellipomakey garnered acclaim after media celebrities shared the soundtrack online. After listening to his music from Vellipomakey, Raj Kandukuri offered him the chance to compose the music for Mental Madhilo (2017). Vihari also composed music for the space-themed Antariksham 9000 KMPH (2018).

Discography

Film soundtracks

Television 

 The Baker and The Beauty (2021)
 Pitta Kathalu (2021)

References

External links 

Living people
Telugu film score composers
Year of birth missing (living people)